Giraffe Tongue Orchestra is an American rock supergroup. It consists of Alice in Chains vocalist William DuVall, guitarist Brent Hinds of Mastodon, lead guitarist Ben Weinman of the Dillinger Escape Plan, drummer Thomas Pridgen of the Mars Volta, and bassist Pete Griffin of Dethklok and Zappa Plays Zappa. The band released their debut LP, Broken Lines, on September 23, 2016.

History
The band was founded in 2012 by Ben Weinman. At one point actress and singer Juliette Lewis fronted it, and at another time featured Eric Avery on bass and Jon Theodore on drums. According to Weinman, Lewis never officially was the singer, but only added some vocal lines. The ten songs of the debut album Broken Lines had been written before DuVall came into the band. The group was called "a real democracy" by Weinman. On the song "Back to the Light" a vocal cameo of Lewis can be heard. The band had its first live appearances at Reading and Leeds Festivals on August 27 and 28, 2016.

Band members
Current members
William DuVall - vocals
Ben Weinman - guitar
Brent Hinds - guitar, backing vocals
Pete Griffin - bass guitar
Thomas Pridgen - drums, percussion

Past members
Juliette Lewis - vocals
Eric Avery - bass guitar
Jon Theodore - drums, percussion

Discography

References 

Alternative metal supergroups
American alternative metal musical groups
American hard rock musical groups
American progressive metal musical groups
Musical groups established in 2012
2012 establishments in the United States